The Truthbarrier is a 1978 poem collection by the Swedish writer Tomas Tranströmer.

References

1978 books
Poetry by Tomas Tranströmer
Swedish poetry collections